Ten 7 Aotearoa (formerly Police Ten 7)  was a New Zealand reality television show, devised, created and produced by Ross Jennings for  Screentime with the assistance of the New Zealand Police for TVNZ 2, a channel owned by public broadcaster TVNZ. The show profiled wanted offenders and asks the public (viewers) to help the police in their search for them. In addition, the programme followed the work of police officers in their patrols and other police activities. In February 2023, TVNZ cancelled the series due to declining viewership. By that time, the series had produced a total of 750 episodes across 29 seasons.

History

Background
New Zealand's earliest versions of a police frontline crime show were Police 5 hosted by Keith Bracey from 1976 until 1986, and a local version of Crimewatch which was hosted by Ian Johnstone with Natalie Brunt (1987–88), Carol Hirschfeld (1989–93), Tiana Tofilau (1994) and Mairanga White (1995–96). Crimewatch aired from 1987 until 1996 when it was replaced a year later by Crimescene with White as host; it aired for two years, finishing in 1998.

Launch
Police Ten 7 was first launched by public broadcaster TVNZ in 2002. The series was hosted by retired Detective Inspector Graham Bell and produced by Australian production company Screentime.  The series took its name from the New Zealand Police ten-code 10-7, which means "Unit has arrived at job". As the show's host, Bell developed a reputation for "straight-talking" and provocative language directed against suspects including "vicious morons," "gutless goons," and "lunatic scumbags."

2014 revamp
In September 2014, Detective Sergeant Rob Lemoto succeeded Bell as Police Ten 7 host. Lemoto's appointment was accompanied by a format update and a cultural shift emphasising the programme's values and representations.

Allegations of racism and 2021 review
By 2021, Police Ten 7 faced allegations of racism against Māori and Pacific Islanders and criticism for its alleged favourable portrayal of policing. Auckland councillor Efeso Collins called TVNZ to scrap the series, claiming that it harmed Māori and Pasifika communities for "low-level" entertainment.  Similar criticism was echoed by Race Relations Commissioner Meng Foon, who claimed that the show perpetuated negative and racist stereotypes of certain ethnic communities. In response, former host Bell defended Police Ten 7, claiming that certain sectors of New Zealand society were "grossly over-represented in the crime statistics." 

Following allegations of racism, TVNZ Screentime commissioned Auckland University of Technology dean of law Khylee Quince​ and media consultant Karen Bieleski to conduct an independent review of Police Ten 7. In late September 2021, the review criticised the series' "goodies versus baddies" approach to crime and policing and Bell's provocative language.  However, the review praised later episodes for focusing on the impact of crime and the mental state of participants. Still, the review concluded that many members of the public did not trust the series due to its earlier episodes. In response to the review, TVNZ's director of content Cate Slater and Screentime chief executive Philly de Lacey confirmed that the series would continue but would be more "responsible and representative of New Zealand's population."

2022 revamp and cancellation
Following the 2021 independent review, the show was renamed Ten 7 Aotearoa in April 2022. In addition, the show's format and style was "refreshed" to give a more representative picture of policing in New Zealand and to focus on crime prevention and education. Presenter Sam Wallace also joined the series as co-host.

On 10 February 2023, TVNZ announced that Ten 7 Aotearoa would be cancelled due to declining audience ratings. Director of content Slater attributed the decline in viewership to the limited viewing window on digital platforms following its initial broadcast and a decline in broadcast viewership towards online viewership. By February 2023, the series had produced a total of 750 episodes across 29 seasons. Ten 7 was credited with 763 arrests and solving over 1,000 crimes including serious assaults and homicides. The series also featured 4,607 criminal cases. Ten 7 will conclude with three one-hour specials in April 2023 on TVNZ 2.

Format

Crimes and wanted criminals
The crimes and wanted offenders section of the show usually features up to five crimes or persons wanted for various offences, including burglary, assault, and drug offences.

One case is the episode's main case, and involves the host visiting the scene of the crime. A local detective takes the host and the audience through the events preceding, during, and following the offence. The alleged offender or offenders wanted are described, often with security camera footage or IdentiKit images. Other cases are described in smaller detail, and are either crimes with unknown offenders, or known offenders with warrants for their arrest.

Viewers are instructed to come forward with any information by telephoning the Police Ten 7 hotline on 0800-10-7-INFO (0800-10-7-4636). Information provided through the Police Ten 7 hotline has resulted in over 450 arrests since the show began, and some recent episodes have resulted in some fast arrests – one show in July 2009 resulted in all five wanted faces being arrested within 48 hours.

Police duties
Each episode usually follows two or three call-outs by police in various cities around New Zealand, for various offences including alcoholism, drugs, violence, vandalism, theft, and general disorder. Sometimes the stories are light-hearted to break with the serious tone of the show. Events included in the 2010 season included the policing of University of Otago's Orientation Week and the Wellington Sevens. The then-coach of the Sevens was questioned over a parking violation, but was released when it was established he had been parked there for "at least thirty seconds".

Distribution
The series also aired in Australia on Fox8 and in the United Kingdom on Pick.

In popular culture
 In October 2009, one of the police duties segments became an internet hit. Auckland’s then Senior Constable, now Senior Sergeant Guy Baldwin was investigating a potential car thief claiming he was going to a local BP service station at 3am to buy a pie, when he told the suspect he must "always blow on the pie", before adding the New Zealand Police motto "Safer communities together".
 The program was often referred to on the Australian radio show Get This.

Awards
 TV Guide Best on the Box Awards 2010 – Best Reality Series
 TV Guide Best on the Box Awards 2011 – Best Reality Series

See also 
 Motorway Patrol

References

External links
Ten 7 page on New Zealand Police website
Police Ten-7 page on the TVNZ website
Blow on the Pie

New Zealand reality television series
2002 New Zealand television series debuts
2000s New Zealand television series
2010s New Zealand television series
2020s New Zealand television series
2023 New Zealand television series endings
Documentary television series about policing
TVNZ 2 original programming
Television series by Screentime